Daihinibaenetes is a genus of sand-treader crickets in the family Rhaphidophoridae. There are at least three described species in Daihinibaenetes.

Species
These three species belong to the genus Daihinibaenetes:
 Daihinibaenetes arizonensis (Tinkham, 1947) i c g b (painted desert sand-treader cricket)
 Daihinibaenetes giganteus Tinkham, 1962 i c g b (giant sand-treader cricket)
 Daihinibaenetes tanneri Tinkham, 1962 i c g b (utah sand-treader cricket)
Data sources: i = ITIS, c = Catalogue of Life, g = GBIF, b = Bugguide.net

References

Further reading

 
 

Ensifera genera
Rhaphidophoridae
Taxonomy articles created by Polbot